Parliamentary elections were held in Guatemala for half the seats in Congress between 16 and 18 January 1953. The Revolutionary Action Party won a plurality of seats.

Results
The four other parties were opposition parties, whilst all independents were pro-government.

Bibliography
Villagrán Kramer, Francisco. Biografía política de Guatemala: años de guerra y años de paz. FLACSO-Guatemala, 2004. 
Political handbook of the world 1953. New York, 1954. 
Elections in the Americas A Data Handbook Volume 1. North America, Central America, and the Caribbean. Edited by Dieter Nohlen. 2005. 
Gleijeses, Piero. 1991. Shattered hope. The Guatemalan Revolution and the United States, 1944-1954. Princeton: Princeton University Press.
Schlesinger, Stephen and Stephen Kinzer. 1982. Bitter fruit: the untold story of the American coup in Guatemala. New York: Doubleday & Company, Inc.
Rodríguez de Ita, Guadalupe. 2003. La participación política en la primavera guatemalteca: una aproximación a la historia de los partidos durante el periodo 1944-1954. México: Universidad Autónoma del Estado de México, Universidad Nacional Autónoma de México.
Silvert, Kalman H. 1954. A study in government: Guatemala. New Orleans: Tulane University.

Elections in Guatemala
Guatemala
1953 in Guatemala
Guatemalan Revolution
Election and referendum articles with incomplete results